Phil Hall (born 8 January 1955) is a British journalist, the former editor of the News of the World and the founder and chairman of the PHA Group, an award-winning London PR agency.

Hall entered journalism in 1974, as a reporter on the Dagenham Post. He then moved to the Ilford Recorder and subsequently filled a sub-editor post on the Newham Recorder, but returned to reporting at the Sunday People. In 1992, he was appointed news editor of the Sunday Express and the following year, he joined the News of the World as assistant editor, becoming deputy editor and, in 1995, editor.

Hall remained in the job until May 2000 when he joined Hello! magazine as editor and later was appointed Editorial Director of Development at Trinity Mirror, before moving into PR consultancy. He founded the PHA Group in 2005, specialising in areas of PR including crisis and campaign management, personal profile building, media relations and more recently, digital communications.

References

1955 births
Living people
British newspaper editors
British public relations people
News of the World people